The Jean Monnet was an express train that linked Brussels Midi/Zuid in Brussels, Belgium, with Strasbourg-Ville in Strasbourg, France, and later also with Bâle SNCF in Basel, Switzerland.  Introduced in 1999, it was operated by the National Railway Company of Belgium (NMBS/SNCB), the Chemins de Fer Luxembourgeois (CFL), and the French National Railway Corporation (SNCF).

The train was named after Jean Monnet (1888–1979), a French political economist and diplomat.  One of the founding fathers of the European Union, he is regarded by many as a chief architect of European unity.

Route
The route of the Jean Monnet was as follows:

Brussels Midi/Zuid – Luxembourg – Strasbourg-Ville (– Bâle SNCF from 2004)

It was particularly appropriate that a train running from Brussels to Strasbourg via Luxembourg be named Jean Monnet, because those three cities are the venues of the main EU institutions.

History
The Jean Monnet first ran on 30 May 1999, as a replacement for the Brussels to Strasbourg section of the EC Edelweiss, which had operated on the same schedule, and with the same train numbers, on that section, and had then continued to Switzerland.

Made up initially of only three coaches, the new train was not a great success until 2004, when it was extended to Basel.

The train's categorisation as a EuroCity was controversial, because it failed to meet two of the criteria for such categorisation: it had no restaurant car, and also too many stops, particularly in Belgium.  These issues meant that the Jean Monnet lacked not only the glamour of the earlier Trans Europ Expresses, but also the more modest charms of a EuroCity meeting all of the usual criteria.

The Jean Monnet last ran on 10 December 2011.

See also

 History of rail transport in Belgium
 History of rail transport in France
 History of rail transport in Italy
 History of rail transport in Luxembourg
 History of rail transport in Switzerland
 List of named passenger trains of Europe

References

External links
 Rail.lu: Jean Monnet – images of the train

EuroCity
International named passenger trains
Named passenger trains of Belgium
Named passenger trains of France
Named passenger trains of Luxembourg
Named passenger trains of Switzerland
Railway services introduced in 1999
Railway services discontinued in 2011
Jean Monnet